The Court Ministry was the 27th Ministry of the Government of Western Australia, led by Liberal Premier Sir Charles Court and deputy Des O'Neil (Ray O'Connor replaced O'Neil following his retirement in 1980). It commenced on 5 June 1975, following the Court–McPharlin Ministry, 15 months after the Coalition's electoral defeat of the Tonkin Labor government. It was followed by the O'Connor Ministry upon Court's retirement as Premier on 25 January 1982.

Overview
On 20 May 1975, the National Country Party (NCP), led by Ray McPharlin, withdrew from the Coalition. At the time, three Ministers had been members of the NCP.  In the ensuing negotiations which included visits from Federal Country Party leader Doug Anthony and Queensland Premier Joh Bjelke-Petersen, Dick Old replaced McPharlin as state party leader. The Coalition recommenced on 31 May.  Court felt that Old had insufficient experience to become Deputy Premier, so while the Government was based on a Liberal-NCP coalition until its defeat by Labor in 1983, both the Premier and Deputy positions were held by members of the parliamentary Liberal Party.

The Ministry was reconstituted three times – first on 10 March 1977, following the 1977 election; on 25 August 1978 after a portfolio reshuffle; and finally on 5 March 1980 following the 1980 election.

The 1977 election, which expanded the Legislative Assembly from 51 to 55 members, saw the Liberal Party gain four seats and come within one seat of being able to govern in their own right. The NCP made the abolition of probate on estates passing to a spouse a condition of forming a coalition with the Liberals. This change in government policy was announced by the Premier after the election. However, due to a reduction in the numbers of NCP members in the Parliament, the NCP's allocation of Ministerial positions in the 13-member Ministry, went from 3 to 2, with the loss of Norm Baxter. Neil McNeill retired from the Ministry, allowing Ian Medcalf to be appointed Attorney-General.

On 24 July 1978, Bill Grayden resigned from the Ministry after pleading guilty to two charges of unlawful assault on police officers, and one of unlawful damage to a police car. Ray O'Connor was appointed as Acting Minister covering all three of Grayden's portfolios and was formally sworn in by the Governor on 7 August 1978. Ray Young was promoted to the Ministry.  A number of significant portfolio changes occurred on 25 August 1978, resulting from a split within the NCP leading to half of its MP's, along with its state president, forming a breakaway National Party. Both of the NCP Ministers stayed with the original party.

The 1980 election, which saw little parliamentary change other than the defeat of Housing Minister Alan Ridge in his Kimberley seat and the retirement of Deputy Premier Des O'Neil from politics, preceded another reconstitution of the Ministry. Ray O'Connor, who had been a member of parliament since 1959, was promoted to the Deputy Premiership whilst two new Ministers were appointed and two Honorary Ministers were appointed. The Government failed to enact legislation which would have amended the Constitution to allow an expansion of the Ministry to 15, on account of maverick Liberal MLA Dr Tom Dadour and the National Party opposing the measure.

On 18 December 1981, Sir Charles Court, then 70 years of age, announced his decision that he would step down as Premier on 25 January 1982. The ministry ended on that date and was succeeded by the O'Connor Ministry.

Ministry

First Ministry

On 5 June 1975, the Governor, Air Commodore Sir Hughie Edwards, designated 12 principal executive offices of the Government under section 43(2) of the Constitution Acts Amendment Act 1899. The following ministers were then appointed to the positions, and served until the reconstitution of the Ministry on 10 March 1977. An honorary minister was appointed two weeks later; following the assent of the Constitution Acts Amendment Act (No.4) 1975 (No.86 of 1975) on 20 November 1975, the Ministry grew to 13 members and Ian Medcalf was formally appointed on 22 December.

The list below is ordered by decreasing seniority within the Cabinet, as indicated by the Government Gazette and the Hansard index. Blue entries indicate members of the Liberal Party, whilst green entries indicate members of the National Country Party. The members of the Ministry were:

Second Ministry

On 10 March 1977, the Governor, Air Chief Marshal Sir Wallace Kyle, designated 13 principal executive offices of the Government under section 43(2) of the Constitution Acts Amendment Act 1899 and appointed the ministers to the positions.

On 24 July 1978, Bill Grayden resigned from the Ministry. Ray O'Connor was appointed the Acting Minister for all three portfolios, and was sworn into them on 7 August 1978. Ray Young was also promoted to the Ministry at this time. These arrangements stayed in place until 25 August reshuffle.

Third Ministry

On 25 August 1978, the Governor, Air Chief Marshal Sir Wallace Kyle, designated 13 principal executive offices of the Government under section 43(2) of the Constitution Acts Amendment Act 1899. The following ministers were then appointed to the positions, and served until the reconstitution of the Ministry on 5 March 1980 following the 1980 state election.

Fourth Ministry

On 5 March 1980, the Governor, Air Chief Marshal Sir Wallace Kyle, designated 13 principal executive offices of the Government under section 43(2) of the Constitution Acts Amendment Act 1899. The following ministers were then appointed to the positions, and served until the end of the Ministry on 25 January 1982, when the O'Connor Ministry was formed by Deputy Premier Ray O'Connor upon the Premier's retirement.

Listed by name and portfolio

References

Court 1.1
Ministries of Elizabeth II